Know Your Customer (KYC) are guidelines and regulations in financial services that require professionals to verify the identity, suitability, and risks involved with maintaining a business relationship with a customer. The procedures fit within the broader scope of anti-money laundering (AML) and Counter terrorism financing (CFT) regulations. 

KYC processes are also employed by companies of all sizes for the purpose of ensuring their proposed customers, agents, consultants, or distributors are anti-bribery compliant, and are actually who they claim to be. Banks, insurers, export creditors, and other financial institutions are increasingly required to make sure that customers provide detailed due diligence information. Initially, these regulations were imposed only on the financial institutions but now the non-financial industry, fintech, virtual assets dealers, and even non-profit organizations are liable to oblige.

Know Your Customer's Customer (KYCC) 
KYCC or Know Your Customer's Customer is a process that identifies a customer's customer activities and nature. This includes the identification of those people, assessing their associated risk levels and associated activities the customer's customer (business) is involved in.

KYCC is a derivative of the standard KYC process, that was necessitated from the growing risk of fraud originating from fraudulent individuals or companies, that may otherwise be hiding in second-tier business relationships. i.e. (a customer's customer).

Know Your Business (KYB) 
Know Your Business or simply KYB is an extension of KYC laws implemented to reduce money laundering. KYB is a set of practices to verify a business. It includes verification of registration credentials, location, the UBOs (Ultimate Beneficial Owners) of that business, etc. Also, the business is screened against blacklists and grey lists to check if it was involved in any sort of criminal activity such as money laundering, terrorist financing, corruption, etc. KYB is significant in identifying fake business entities and shell companies. it is crucial for efficient KYC and AML compliance.

According to the European Union's 5th AML directive, KYB is required for the following AML-regulated entities:

 Credit institutions
 Crypto marketplaces
 Estate agents
 External accountants
 Financial institutions
 Gambling services
 Notaries
 Online banking
 Online payment services
 Services auditors
 Tax advisors
 Trusts
 etc.

Electronic know your customer (eKYC) 
Electronic know your customer (eKYC) involves the use of internet or digital means of identity verification.  This may involve checking information provided is valid by using systems to validate ID and proof of address documents or by checking information against government databases such as the official passport database of a country.

Laws by country

Australia: The Australian Transaction Reports and Analysis Centre (AUSTRAC), established in 1989, monitors financial transactions in Australia  and sets client identification requirements.
Canada: The Financial Transactions and Reports Analysis Centre of Canada (FINTRAC), established in 2000, is Canada's financial intelligence unit. It updated its regulations in June 2016 regarding acceptable methods to determine the identity of individual clients to ensure compliance with AML and KYC regulations. A pending lawsuit is active in Canada challenging the constitutionality of the new legislation.
India: The Reserve Bank of India introduced KYC guidelines for banks in 2002.
Italy: The Banca d'Italia exercises regulation power for the financial industry, in 2007 set KYC requirements for financial institutions that operate on Italian territory.
Japan: Act on identification of customers by financial institutions 2003
Mexico: The "Federal Law for Prevention and Identification of Operations with Resources from Illicit Origin", promulgated in 2012 with president Felipe Calderon's administration and came into force in 2013 with the president Enrique Peña Nieto administration.
Namibia: Financial Intelligence Act, 2012 (Act No. 13 of 2012) published as Government Notice 299 in Gazette 5096 of 14 December 2012.
New Zealand: Updated KYC laws were enacted in late 2009 and entered into force in 2010. KYC is mandatory for all registered banks and financial institutions (the latter has an extremely wide meaning).
South Korea: Act on Reporting and Use of Certain Financial Transaction Information regulates due diligence in the country.
United Kingdom: The Money Laundering Regulations 2017 are the underlying rules that govern KYC in the UK. Many UK businesses use the guidance provided by the European Joint Money Laundering Steering Group along with the Financial Conduct Authority's 'Financial Crime: A guide for firms' as an aid to compliance.

Criticism 
Criticisms of this policy include:

 Know your customer places a costly burden on businesses operating in the financial industry, especially smaller financial companies where compliance costs are disproportionately heavy. 
 Customers may feel the information requested to be intrusive and burdensome and may choose not to enter the business relationship as a result.
 Innocent, law-abiding individuals such as digital nomads are very likely disproportionately disadvantaged as living a nomadic life makes it increasingly difficult or even impossible to hold any formal banking relationship anywhere in the world due to lack of proof of address, bills, and/or debt documentation required by KYC. 
 Some citizens in other countries (Canada) are fighting back against the USA over-reach into their sovereign banking system and have challenged new USA law in their courts.

See also

 Anti-money laundering
 Anti-money laundering software
 Bribery
 Certified copy
 Financial Action Task Force on Money Laundering
 Political corruption
 Politically exposed person

References

Bank regulation
Banking in India
Banking industry
Mobile payments
Identity documents
Identity management systems